Keith Alfred Smith (born October 5, 1976) is a former Canadian football quarterback in the Canadian Football League (CFL). He played for the Saskatchewan Roughriders and Calgary Stampeders. He played college football at Arizona.

Prior to his college career, he was drafted by the Detroit Tigers in the fifth round of the 1994 Major League Baseball Draft and played one season in the Tigers organization as a shortstop.

References

External links

1976 births
Living people
Sportspeople from Santa Barbara, California
Players of American football from California
American football quarterbacks
Canadian football quarterbacks
Arizona Wildcats football players
Bristol Tigers players
Fayetteville Generals players
Saskatchewan Roughriders players
Calgary Stampeders players
Baseball players from California